Easy Come, Easy Go is the second studio album, released in 1994, by the American new jack swing group Joe Public.

Track listing

References

1994 albums
Columbia Records albums